Eugene R. Geesey (born December 1, 1931) is a former Republican member of the Pennsylvania House of Representatives.

References

Republican Party members of the Pennsylvania House of Representatives
Living people
1931 births
People from Dallastown, Pennsylvania